Saw Moe Myint (born 2 January 1947) also  Sin Myu Yay()  is a Burmese politician who currently serves as an Amyotha Hluttaw MP for Kayin State No. 1 Constituency. He is a member of the National League for Democracy.

Early life and education
Saw was  born on 2 January 1947 in Taungoo, Myanmar. He is an ethnic Karen. He graduated with B.E (mining), P.E (mining) from Yangon.

Political career
He is a member of the National League for Democracy. In the 2015 Myanmar general election, he was elected as an Amyotha Hluttaw MP, winning a majority of 34849 votes and elected representative from Kayin  State No. 1, parliamentary constituency . And then, he also serves as a member of Amyotha Hluttaw Mineral, Natural Resources and Environmental Conservation Committee.

References

National League for Democracy politicians
1947 births
Living people
People from Bago Region
Burmese people of Karen descent